Alexei or Alexey Ivanov may refer to:

Sports
Aleksei Ivanov (footballer, born 1981), Russian footballer with FC Saturn Moscow Oblast
Alexei Ivanov (ice hockey, born 1985), Russian ice hockey player drafted by the NHL Chicago Blackhawks
Alexei Ivanov (ice hockey, born 1988), Kazakh ice hockey goaltender
Alexey Ivanov (athlete), Russian Paralympic track and field athlete
Aliaksei Ivanou (born 1980), Belarusian skier

Others
Alexei Ivanov (writer) (born 1969), Russian writer
Aleksei Ivanovich Ivanov (1878–1937), Russian sinologist and tangutologist
Alexei Ivanov (serial killer) (born 1979), Russian serial killer
Aleksey Vladimirovich Ivanov, defendant in the US case United States v. Ivanov